Genevieve Cogman is a British author of fantasy literature and role-playing games.

Life
Cogman has an MSc in Statistics with Medical Applications. She works for the NHS as a clinical classifications specialist and lives in the north of England.

Cogman has also worked as a freelance role-playing author, contributing towards the Steve Jackson Games titles In Nomine and GURPS, the White Wolf Publishing titles Orpheus and Exalted, and the Evil Hat Productions title The Dresden Files.

Writing
Cogman's debut novel The Invisible Library was released in January 2015.  The book was the first in an eponymous series, continued by The Masked City (December 2015), The Burning Page (December 2016), The Lost Plot (2017), The Mortal Word (2018), The Secret Chapter (2019), The Dark Archive (2020) and its final title, The Untold Story (2021). The series revolves around a team of secretive undercover librarians who travel to alternate realities to acquire works of fiction on behalf of a sprawling interdimensional library that exists outside of normal space and time. The main character is Irene, a Junior Librarian with a great British humour, and the adventures she has with her assistant and friend, the mysterious and charming Kai. The series incorporates numerous fantasy elements including steampunk, supernatural beings, and magic.

Bibliography

The Invisible Library novels
Book 1: The Invisible Library London: Pan Macmillan, 2015. 
Book 2: The Masked City London: Pan Macmillan, 2015. 
Book 3: The Burning Page London: Pan Macmillan, 2016. 
Book 4: The Lost Plot London: Pan Macmillan, 2017. 
Book 5: The Mortal Word London: Pan Macmillan, 2018. 
Book 6: The Secret Chapter London: Pan Macmillan, 2019. 
Book 7: The Dark Archive London: Pan Macmillan, 2020. 
Book 8: The Untold Story London: Pan Macmillan, 2021.

Other books
Lois McMaster Bujold's Vorkosigan Saga: Sourcebook and Roleplaying Game (2009)

Short fiction
"Snow and Salt" (2004)
"The Final Path" (2016)

References

External links

 Official website

Living people
British women novelists
21st-century British novelists
British fantasy writers
Role-playing game designers
White Wolf game designers
Women science fiction and fantasy writers
21st-century British women writers
Year of birth missing (living people)